Lockhart Township may refer to the following townships in the United States:

 Lockhart Township, Pike County, Indiana
 Lockhart Township, Norman County, Minnesota